Hemixos is a songbird genus in the bulbul family, Pycnonotidae.

Taxonomy and systematics

Established by Edward Blyth in 1845 for the newly discovered ashy bulbul (H. flavala), this genus contains four extant species.

Some treatments merge the genus into Hypsipetes, often together with the rest of the traditional "Hypsipetes group" of bulbuls: Iole, Ixos, Microscelis and Tricholestes. But in this case, the closely related genera Alophoixus and Setornis would probably also have to be included, and as soon as the earliest described genus, Ixos, is merged with another its name would apply.

In fact, Hemixos is not particularly close to Hypsipetes, and a merger is not well justified. mtDNA NADH dehydrogenase subunits 2 and 3 and nDNA β-fibrinogen intron 7 sequence data puts it closer to (but still well distant from) the streaked bulbul (Ixos malaccensis). But whether that species represents the core group of Ixos – around its type species I. virescens (Sunda bulbul or green-winged bulbul) –, or a distinct lineage worthy of separation in a new genus – in which case Hypsipetes might be merged into the core group of Ixos – has not been studied. In any case, though minor, the Hemixos lineage with its stark white throat and light wing patches seems well distinct.

Extant species

Four species are currently recognised:
 Cream-striped bulbul	(Hemixos leucogrammicus; moved from Pycnonotus following molecular phylogenetic analyses)
 Ashy bulbul (Hemixos flavala)
 Cinereous bulbul (Hemixos cinereus)
 Chestnut bulbul (Hemixos castanonotus)

Former species

Previously, some authorities also classified the following species (or subspecies) as species within the genus Hemixos:
 Sumatran bulbul (as Hemixus sumatranus)

Footnotes

References

 Gregory, Steven M. (2000): Nomenclature of the Hypsipetes Bulbuls (Pycnonotidae). Forktail 16: 164–166. PDF fulltext
 Moyle, Robert G. & Marks, Ben D. (2006): Phylogenetic relationships of the bulbuls (Aves: Pycnonotidae) based on mitochondrial and nuclear DNA sequence data. Mol. Phylogenet. Evol. 40(3): 687–695.  (HTML abstract)
 Pasquet, Éric; Han, Lian-Xian; Khobkhet, Obhas & Cibois, Alice (2001): Towards a molecular systematics of the genus Criniger, and a preliminary phylogeny of the bulbuls (Aves, Passeriformes, Pycnonotidae). Zoosystema 23(4): 857–863. PDF fulltext

 
Bulbuls
Bird genera
Taxa named by Edward Blyth
Taxonomy articles created by Polbot